La Genétouze (before 2017: La Génétouze) is a commune in the Vendée department in the Pays de la Loire region in western France.

See also
Communes of the Vendée department

References

Communes of Vendée